Kevin Joseph MacAdam (born February 28, 1967) is a Canadian political advisor and former politician .

Born in West Saint Peters, the son of Stephen MacAdam, he was educated at the University of Prince Edward Island, and worked as a researcher and analyst.

Political career
MacAdam was a member of the Legislative Assembly of Prince Edward Island from 1996 to 2006, representing the electoral district of Morell-Fortune Bay as a member of the Progressive Conservative Party. At the age of 29, he was named Minister of Fisheries, becoming the youngest cabinet minister in the history of Prince Edward Island.

MacAdam also stood as the federal Progressive Conservative candidate in Cardigan in the 2000 federal election, losing to Lawrence MacAulay by a margin of less than 300 votes. He resigned his seat in the provincial assembly to run for the federal seat but was reelected to the assembly in a subsequent by-election.

Political advisor
MacAdam resigned from public office and left provincial politics in the spring of 2006 to serve as a political advisor to Peter MacKay, the federal minister responsible for Prince Edward Island.

Electoral record

References 
 O'Handley, K Canadian Parliamentary Guide, 2000 

People from Kings County, Prince Edward Island
1967 births
Living people
Members of the Executive Council of Prince Edward Island
Progressive Conservative Party of Prince Edward Island MLAs
Prince Edward Island candidates for Member of Parliament
Progressive Conservative Party of Canada candidates for the Canadian House of Commons
Candidates in the 2000 Canadian federal election
21st-century Canadian politicians